is a railway station on the Fujikyuko Line in the city of Tsuru, Yamanashi, Japan, operated by Fuji Kyuko (Fujikyu).

Lines

Station layout
The station is unstaffed, and consists of a single side platform serving a single bidirectional track. It has a waiting room and toilet facilities.

Adjacent stations

History
Akasaka Station opened on 19 June 1929.

Passenger statistics
In fiscal 1998, the station was used by an average of 1,239 passengers daily.

Surrounding area
 Katsura High School

See also
 List of railway stations in Japan

References

External links

 Fujikyuko station information 

Railway stations in Yamanashi Prefecture
Railway stations in Japan opened in 1929
Stations of Fuji Kyuko
Tsuru, Yamanashi